The Gippsland League (formerly known as the West Gippsland Latrobe Football League) is an Australian rules football and netball league in the Gippsland region of Victoria, Australia. It is considered the only AFL Victoria major league in Gippsland.

History

The original Gippsland Football Association was formed in 1889, at a meeting of club delegates from the following clubs - Hazelwood, Morwell, Rosedale, Thorpedale, Traralgon and Yarrum.

The Gippsland Football Netball League (GFNL) has roots dating back to the Central Gippsland Football League (CGFL) which was founded in 1909 with many former CGFL clubs now part of the GFNL.

The CGFL morphed into the Latrobe Valley Football League in 1954. The promoters of the LVFL wanted to have a league that consisted of towns along the Orbost railway line, from Warragul to Sale. "The background of the move, as reported on several occasions in this journal, is (1) to remove unbalances in the present population strengths of the towns at present fielding teams in the Central Gippsland Football League; (2) to link up with towns with the same community of interest; (3) to uplift the standard of football, by bringing the strongest clubs into competition; (4) to strengthen clubs financially through expected enhanced gates."

Three clubs from south Gippsland towns, Leongatha, Korumburra and Mirboo North, were therefore barred from joining the new league and went on to form the South Gippsland FL. The Central Gippsland Football League actually folded, when seven clubs joined the new La Trobe Valley Football League and due to their geographical location these three remaining clubs chose not to join the La Trobe Valley Football League. These three club's then joined the South Gippsland Football League in 1954, with Leongatha entering two senior teams - Green & Gold!

The LVFL changed its name, in 1995, to the Gippsland Latrobe FL.

At the end of 2001, The West Gippsland FL and the Gippsland Latrobe FL had an administrative merger. This created a two-division competition and a name change to the West Gippsland Latrobe FL.

From 2002 until 2004, the league comprised a premier division, consisting mainly of the former Gippsland-Latrobe clubs, and a western division, comprising most of the former WGFL clubs.

After the 2004 season, the western division was dissolved, with Warragul, Drouin and Garfield joining the premier league. The remaining clubs from the western division moved to other competitions, such as the Alberton Football League, Ellinbank & District Football League and the Mornington Peninsula Nepean Football League.

In 2009, Garfield left the GFL for the Ellinbank & District Football League, whilst Wonthaggi and Bairnsdale joined the GFL in 2010 and 2011 respectively.

The Latrobe Valley area does not have a team participating in the Victorian Football League. Traralgon competed in the VFL during 1996-97, winning just four matches across those two years, before returning to the regional competition. The region does have a representative team in the TAC Cup Under-18 competition, Gippsland Power.

The Central & Southern Gippsland Competition league was founded in 2019.

Clubs
As of 2019, the Gippsland League consists of the following teams:

Former clubs

Players

VFL/AFL Players
A number of players from the Gippsland league have gone on to play and have success at the AFL level.

Premiers and Best & Fairest Winners

Records and Statistics
Finishing positions of current clubs since 1954

Recent finishing positions

Significant records

2022 Ladder 
   
   
FINALS

References

External links

 SportsTG site
 Gippsland FNL - Football Best & Fairest Lists
 West Gippsland Latrobe Football League (Archived, 30 Aug 2003)
 Gippsland League on Country Footy Scores

 
Australian rules football competitions in Victoria (Australia)
Netball leagues in Victoria (Australia)
Articles containing video clips